The Beeching cuts (also Beeching Axe) was a plan to increase the efficiency of the nationalised railway system in Great Britain. The plan was outlined in two reports: The Reshaping of British Railways (1963) and The Development of the Major Railway Trunk Routes (1965), written by Richard Beeching and published by the British Railways Board.

The second report identified a small number of major routes for significant investment. The 1963 report also recommended some less well-publicised changes, including a switch to the now-standard practice of containerisation for rail freight, and the replacement of some services with integrated bus services linked to the remaining railheads.

Protests resulted in the saving of some stations and lines, but the majority were closed as planned; Beeching's name remains associated with the mass closure of railways and the loss of many local services in the period that followed. A few of these routes have since reopened; some short sections have been preserved as heritage railways, while others have been incorporated into the National Cycle Network or used for road schemes; others have since been built over, have reverted to farmland, or remain derelict with no plans for any reuse or redevelopment. Some, such as the bulk of the Midland Metro network around Birmingham and Wolverhampton, have since been incorporated into light rail lines.

Background

The network had opened up major travel opportunities for the entire country that had never been available before. However, lines were sometimes uneconomic, and several Members of Parliament had direct involvement with railways, creating a conflict of interest. In 1909, Winston Churchill, then President of the Board of Trade, argued that the country's railways did not have a future without rationalisation and amalgamation. By 1914, the railways had some significant problems, such as a lack of standard rolling stock and too many duplicated routes.

After the war, the railways faced increasing competition from a growing road transport network, which had increased to 8 million tons of freight annually by 1921. Around  of passenger railways closed between 1923 and 1939. These closures included the Charnwood Forest Railway, closed to passengers in 1931, and the Harborne Line in Birmingham, closed to passengers in 1934. Some lines had never been profitable and were not subject to loss of traffic in that period. The railways were busy during the Second World War, but at the end of the war they were in a poor state of repair and in 1948 nationalised as British Railways.

The Branch Lines Committee of the British Transport Commission (BTC) was formed in 1949 with a brief to close the least-used branch lines. In opposition to these cuts, the period also witnessed the beginning of a protest movement led by the Railway Development Association, whose most famous member was the poet John Betjeman. They went on to be a significant force resisting the Beeching proposals.

Economic recovery and the end of petrol rationing led to rapid growth in car ownership and use. Vehicle mileage grew at a sustained annual rate of 10% between 1948 and 1964. In contrast, railway traffic remained steady during the 1950s but the economic situation steadily deteriorated, with labour costs rising faster than income and fares and freight charges repeatedly frozen by the government to try to control inflation. By 1955, the railways' share of the transport market had dropped from 16% to 5%.

The 1955 Modernisation Plan promised expenditure of over £1,240 million; steam locomotives would be replaced with diesel and electric locomotives, traffic levels would increase, and the system was predicted to be back in profit by 1962. Instead losses mounted, from £68 million in 1960 to £87 million in 1961, and £104 million in 1962 (£ billion in  terms). The BTC could no longer pay the interest on its loans.

By 1961, losses were running at £300,000 a day; since nationalisation in 1948,  of line had been closed, railway staff numbers had fallen 26% from 648,000 to 474,000 and the number of railway wagons had fallen 29% from 1,200,000 to 848,000.

The Beeching reports

The Reshaping of British Railways (Beeching I) 

The first Beeching report, titled The Reshaping of British Railways, was published on 27 March 1963.

The report starts by quoting the brief provided by the Prime Minister, Harold Macmillan, from 1960: "First, the industry must be of a size and pattern suited to modern conditions and prospects. In particular, the railway system must be modelled to meet current needs, and the modernisation plan must be adapted to this new shape" and with the premise that the railways should be run as a profitable business.

Beeching first studied traffic flows on all lines to identify "the good, the bad, and the indifferent". His analysis showed that the least-used 1,762 stations had annual passenger receipts of less than £2,500 each (£ as of ), that over half of the 4,300 stations open to passengers in 1960 had receipts of less than £10,000, that the least-used 50% of stations contributed only 2% of passenger revenue, and that one third of route miles carried just 1% of passengers.

By way of example, he noted that the line from Thetford to Swaffham carried five trains each weekday in each direction, carrying an average of nine passengers with only 10% of the costs of operating the line covered by fares; another example was the Gleneagles-Crieff-Comrie line which had ten trains a day and five passengers on average, earning only 25% of costs. Finally there was the service from Hull to York via Beverley (using part of the Yorkshire Coast Line, which was not closed, and the York to Beverley Line, which was). The line covered 80% of its operating costs, but he calculated that it could be closed because there was an alternative, but less direct, route.

A total of 2,363 stations were to close, including 435 already under threat, both on lines that were to close and on lines that were to remain open.

He recommended that freight services should mainly be for bulk commodities such as minerals and coal, and that the freight system make use of new containerised handling systems rather than less efficient and slower wagon-load traffic. The latter recommendation would prove prescient with the rise of intermodal freight transport in the following decades.

The Development of the Major Railway Trunk Routes (Beeching II)

On 16 February 1965, Beeching introduced the second stage of his reorganisation of the railways.

This policy would result in traffic being routed along nine lines. Traffic to Coventry, Birmingham, Manchester, Liverpool and Scotland would be routed through the West Coast Main Line to Carlisle and Glasgow; traffic to the north-east of England would be concentrated through the East Coast Main Line, which was to be closed north of Newcastle; and traffic to Wales and the West Country would go on the Great Western Main Line to Swansea and Plymouth.

Underpinning Beeching's proposals was his belief that there was too much duplication in the railway network: "The real choice is between an excessive and increasingly un-economic system, with a corresponding tendency for the railways as a whole to fall into disrepute and decay, or the selective development and intensive utilisation of a more limited trunk route system". In Scotland, only the Central Belt routes and the lines via Fife and Perth to Aberdeen were selected for development, and none were selected in Wales, apart from the Great Western Main Line as far as Swansea.

Beeching's secondment from ICI ended early in June 1965 after Harold Wilson's attempt to get him to produce a transport plan failed. It is a matter of debate whether Beeching left by mutual arrangement with the government or if he was sacked. Frank Cousins, the Labour Minister of Technology, told the House of Commons in November 1965 that Beeching had been dismissed by Tom Fraser, then Minister of Transport. Beeching denied this, pointing out that he had returned early to ICI as he would not have had enough time to undertake an in-depth transport study before the formal end of his secondment.

The closures

The first report was accepted by the Conservative government of the day, which argued that many services could be provided more effectively by buses.
Most recommendations were subsequently taken forward by the Labour government elected in 1964, but many of the proposed closures sparked protests from communities that would lose their trains, a lot of which (especially rural communities) had no other public transport. 
One of the last major closures was the 98-mile long (158 km) Waverley Route between Carlisle, Hawick and Edinburgh in 1969; the reopening of a 35-mile section of this line was approved in 2006 and passenger services resumed in September 2015.

Holiday and coastal resorts were severely affected by the closures. The report recommended closing almost all services along the coasts of north Devon, Cornwall and East Anglia aside from Norwich to Great Yarmouth. All services on the Isle of Wight were recommended for closure, as were all branch lines in the Lake District. One of the most significant closures was the Great Central Main Line from London Marylebone to Leicester and Sheffield.

Not all the recommended closures were implemented. Reprieved lines include:
 Lines through the Scottish Highlands, such as the Far North Line, were kept open, in part because of pressure from the powerful Highland lobby.
 The Central Wales Line was said to have been kept open because it passed through so many marginal constituencies that no one dared to close it.
 The Tamar Valley Line in Devon and Cornwall was kept open because the local roads were poor.
 The Marshlink line between Ashford and Hastings remained open because of problems retaining replacement bus services.
 Other routes (or parts of routes) planned for closure that survived include the Settle-Carlisle Line, Ipswich–Lowestoft, the Hope Valley Line (but the Woodhead Line and Bakewell route closed, though these were not Beeching cuts but made subsequently), Buxton Line, Ayr–Stranraer, Glasgow–Kilmarnock, Glasgow–Edinburgh via Shotts, Barrow–Whitehaven,  Middlesbrough–Whitby, York–Harrogate, Leeds/Bradford–Ilkley, Nottingham–Lincoln, Boston–Skegness, Birkenhead–Wrexham, Liverpool–Southport (and other Merseyside commuter routes), Bury-Manchester, Leicester–Peterborough, St Erth–St Ives and Ryde–Shanklin.

The Beeching Report was intended to be the first stage in the rail network's contraction. As a result, some lines it had not recommended for closure were subsequently shut down, such as the Woodhead Line between Manchester and Sheffield in 1981, after the freight traffic (mostly coal) on which it had relied declined. Many surviving lines were rationalised, including reduction to single track and consolidation of signals. Most of the Oxford–Cambridge Varsity Line closed despite its strategic location serving Milton Keynes, Britain's largest "new town". Kinross-shire, and Fife especially, suffered closures not included in the Report, including the main line from Edinburgh to Perth. King's Lynn was to have remained at the centre of routes towards Norwich, Hunstanton and Wisbech, all of which closed.

With a few exceptions, after the early 1970s proposals to close other lines were met with vociferous public opposition and were quietly shelved. This opposition likely stemmed from the public experience of the many line closures during the cuts in the mid- and late 1960s.

Critical analysis

Disposals of land and structures 

Beeching's reports made no recommendations about the handling of land after closures. British Rail operated a policy of disposing of land that was surplus to requirements. Many bridges, cuttings and embankments have been removed and the land sold for development. Closed station buildings on remaining lines have often been demolished or sold for housing or other purposes. Increasing pressure on land use meant that protection of closed trackbeds, as in other countries (such as the US Rail Bank scheme, which holds former railway land for possible future use) was not seen to be practical. Many redundant structures from closed lines remain, such as bridges over other lines and drainage culverts. They often require maintenance as part of the rail infrastructure while providing no benefit. Critics of Beeching argue that the lack of recommendations on the handling of closed railway property demonstrates that the report was short-sighted. On the other hand, retaining a railway on these routes, which would obviously have increased maintenance costs, might not have earned enough to justify that greater cost. As demand for rail has grown since the 1990s, the failure to preserve the routes of closed lines (such as the one between Bedford and Cambridge, which was closed despite Beeching recommending its retention) has been criticised.

Acceptance of rail subsidies
By 1968, the railways had not been restored to profitability and Beeching's approach appeared to many to have failed. It has been suggested that by closing almost a third of the network Beeching achieved a saving of just £30 million, whilst overall losses were running in excess of £100 million per year. However, the precise savings from closures are impossible to calculate. The Ministry of Transport subsequently estimated that rail operating costs had been cut by over £100 million in the wake of the Beeching Report but that much of this had been swallowed up by increased wages. Some of the branches closed acted as feeders to the main lines, and that feeder traffic was lost when the branches closed; the financial significance of this is debatable, for over 90% of the railways' 1960 traffic was carried on lines which remained open ten years later.

Whatever the figures, towards the end of the 1960s it became increasingly clear that rail closures were not bringing the rail system out of deficit and were unlikely ever to do so. Transport minister Barbara Castle decided that some rail services, which could not pay their way but had a valuable social role, should be subsidised. Legislation allowing this was introduced in the Transport Act 1968 (section 39 made provision for a subsidy to be paid by the Treasury for a three-year period) but this was later repealed in the Railways Act 1974. Whether these subsidies affected the size of the network is questionable: the criteria for reprieving loss-making lines had not altered, merely the way their costs appeared in the railways accounts—previously their contribution to the railways' overall loss was hidden in the total deficit.

Replacement buses and proposed alternatives
The "bustitution" policy that replaced rail services with buses also failed. In many cases the replacement bus services were slower and less convenient than the trains they were meant to replace, and so were unpopular. Replacement bus services were often run between the (now disused) station sites (some of which were some distance from the population centres they served), thus losing any potential advantage over the closed rail service. Most replacement bus services lasted less than two years before they were removed due to a lack of patronage, leaving large parts of the country with no public transport.

The assumption at the time was that car owners would drive to the nearest railhead (which was usually the junction where the closed branch line would otherwise have taken them) and continue their journey onwards by train. In practice, having left home in their cars, people used them for the whole journey. Similarly for freight: without branch lines, the railways' ability to transport goods "door to door" was dramatically reduced. As in the passenger model, it was assumed that lorries would pick up goods and transport them to the nearest railhead, where they would be taken across the country by train, unloaded onto another lorry and taken to their destination. The development of the motorway network, the advent of containerisation, improvements in lorries and the economic costs of having two break-bulk points combined to make long-distance road transport a more viable alternative.

Many of the closed lines had run at only a small deficit. Some lines such as the Sunderland-to-West Hartlepool line cost only £291 per mile to operate. Closures of such small-scale loss-making lines made little difference to the overall deficit.

Possible changes to light railway-type operations were attacked by Beeching, who wrote: "The third suggestion, that rail buses should be substituted for trains, ignores the high cost of providing the route itself, and also ignores the fact that rail buses are more expensive vehicles than road buses." There is little in the Beeching report recommending general economies (in administration costs, working practices and so on). For example, a number of the stations that were closed were fully staffed 18 hours a day, on lines controlled by multiple Victorian era signalboxes (again fully staffed, often throughout the day). Operating costs could have been reduced by reducing staff and removing redundant services on these lines while keeping the stations open. This has since been successfully achieved by British Rail and its successors on lesser-used lines that survived the cuts, such as the East Suffolk Line from Ipswich to Lowestoft, which survives as a "basic railway".

Traffic on the single-track Golden Valley Line between Kemble and Swindon and the Cotswold Line between Oxford and Worcester has increased significantly, and double track has now been reinstated on the Golden Valley Line, partly to facilitate a diversionary route during electrification and other works on the Severn tunnel line.

The people and the politics
The Conservatives increased their Commons majority in the general election of 8 October 1959, their first with Harold Macmillan as Prime Minister. Ernest Marples, previously Postmaster General, was made Transport Minister two weeks later in a cabinet reshuffle; Macmillan noted that the Northern working-class boy who had won a scholarship to a grammar school was one of only two "self-made men" in his cabinet.

Marples had a background with a successful road construction company. When opening the M1 motorway, he said: "This motorway starts a new era in road travel. It is in keeping with the bold scientific age in which we live. It is a powerful weapon to add to our transport system." His association with the high-profile construction company Marples Ridgway became a matter of concern to both the public and politicians. As is customary, he resigned as a director of the company in 1951 on becoming a junior minister, but he only disposed of his shares in the company in 1960 after the company won a contract to build the Hammersmith Flyover, when questions were asked both in the media and also in the Commons on 28 January 1960; he made a statement to the House later that day confirming that the sale of shares was in hand and would be completed "very soon", noting that as part of the agreement he could be required to buy the shares from the purchaser at the original price after he ceased to hold office, if so desired by the purchaser. While it was reported that he sold the shares to his wife, she denied in a newspaper interview, that any transaction had taken place. It was reported that he had transferred his shares into an Overseas Trust. In July 1964, Marples Ridgway and Partners Limited were awarded a £4.1 million contract for the "Hendon Urban Motorway" extension of the M1, in the same year that the company was taken over by the Bath and Portland Group. There was no evidence of any wrongdoing on anyone's part in this or any of the other contracts awarded to the company during his term of office, it did however lead to a sense of unease, not least within the railway sector.

In April 1960, Sir Ivan Stedeford established an advisory group known as the Stedeford Committee at the request of Harold Macmillan to report on the state of the British Transport Commission and to make recommendations. Sir Ewart Smith, a retired former Chief Engineer at Imperial Chemical Industries (ICI), was asked by Ernest Marples to become a member of an advisory group; Smith declined but recommended Richard Beeching in his place, a suggestion that Marples accepted. Beeching, with a PhD in Physics, had been appointed to the main board of ICI at the age of 43. The board consisted of senior figures in British businesses, and none of the board had previous knowledge or experience of the railway industry. Stedeford and Beeching clashed on a number of issues, but the future size of the railway system was not one of them. For all the suspicion it aroused, the committee had little to say on this and the government was already convinced of the need to reduce the size of the rail network. In spite of questions being asked in Parliament, Sir Ivan's report was not published at the time. In December 1960 questions were asked in the Lords about this "secret" and "under-the-counter" study group. It was later suggested that Stedeford had recommended that the government should set up another body "to consider the size and pattern of the railway system required to meet current and foreseeable needs, in the light of developments and trends in other forms of transport ... and other relevant considerations".

Marples then appointed Beeching as Chairman of the British Transport Commission in March 1961. He would receive the same yearly salary that he was earning at ICI, the controversial sum of £24,000 (£,000 in  terms), £10,000 more than Sir Brian Robertson, the previous chairman of the BTC, £14,000 more than Prime Minister Harold Macmillan, and two-and-a-half times higher than the salary of any head of a nationalised industry at the time. At that time the government was seeking outside talent to sort out the huge problems of the railway network, and he was confident that he could make the railways pay for themselves, but his salary, at 35 times that of many railway workers, has been described as a "political disaster".

The Transport Act 1962 dissolved the British Transport Commission (BTC), which had overseen the railways, canals and road freight transport and established the British Railways Board, which took over on 1 January 1963, with Dr Beeching as its first chairman. The Act put in place measures that simplified the process of closing railways by removing the need for the pros and cons of each case to be heard in detail. It was described as the "most momentous piece of legislation in the field of railway law to have been enacted since the Railway and Canal Traffic Act 1854".

The general election in October 1964 returned a Labour government under Prime Minister Harold Wilson after 13 years of Conservative government. During the election campaign Labour had promised to halt rail closures if elected, but it quickly backtracked, and later oversaw some of the most controversial closures. Tom Fraser was appointed Minister of Transport, but was replaced by Barbara Castle in December 1965. Castle published a map in 1967, Network for Development, showing the railway system "stabilised" at around 11,000 route miles (17,700 km).

Section 39 of the Transport Act 1968 made provision for grants to be paid in relation to loss-making lines and services, but many of the services and railway lines that would have qualified had already been closed. A number of branch lines and local services were saved by this legislation.

After 1970, when the Conservatives were returned to power, serious thought was given to a further programme of closures, but this proved politically impossible. In 1982, under the government of Margaret Thatcher, Sir David Serpell, a civil servant who had worked with Beeching, compiled the Serpell Report which said that a profitable railway could be achieved only by closing much of what remained. The report's infamous "Option A" proposed greatly increasing fares and reducing the rail network to a mere , leaving only  of railway in Wales (a section of the South Wales Main Line from the Severn Tunnel to ) and none in Somerset, Devon or Cornwall. The Midland Main Line was planned to close, leaving Leicester and Derby without a rail link, while the East Coast Main Line, part of the key London/Edinburgh link, was intended to be cut north of Newcastle. The report was published on 20 January 1983 and received an immediate backlash from the media. It was quietly shelved in the run up to the 1983 election.

Ian Hislop comments that history has been somewhat unkind to "Britain's most hated civil servant", by forgetting that Beeching proposed a much better bus service that ministers never delivered, and that in some ways he was used to do their "dirty work for them". Hislop describes him as "a technocrat [who] wasn't open to argument to romantic notions of rural England or the warp and weft of the train in our national identity. He didn't buy any of that. He went for a straightforward profit and loss approach and some claim we are still reeling from that today". Beeching was unrepentant about his role in the closures: "I suppose I'll always be looked upon as the axe man, but it was surgery, not mad chopping".

On 7 June 2019, former Minister for Transport Andrew Adonis delivered a speech on "Reversing Beeching".

Reopenings 

Since the Beeching cuts, road traffic levels have grown significantly and since privatisation in the mid-1990s there have been record levels of passengers on the railways owing to a preference to living in smaller towns and rural areas, and in turn commuting longer distances (although the impact of this is disputed). A few of the railway closures have been reversed. However, despite the considerable increase in railway journeys since the mid-1990s, rail transport's share of the total passenger transport market remains below that of the early 1960s, with road overwhelmingly the dominant mode: rail's market share was 13% in 1961, 6% in 1991 and 2001, and 10% in 2014.

Some closed stations have reopened, and passenger services have been restored on a few lines where they had been removed.

Heritage railways

Some lines closed under the Beeching cuts have reopened as private heritage railways. Some examples are East Lancs Railway, Mid Hants Railway, North Yorkshire Moors Railway, North Norfolk Railway and West Somerset Railway.

In popular culture
Flanders and Swann, writers and performers of satirical songs, wrote a lament for lines closed by the Beeching cuts entitled "Slow Train" (1963). Michael Williams' book On the slow train takes its name from the Flanders and Swann song. It celebrates 12 of the most beautiful and historic journeys in Britain, some of which were saved from the Beeching cuts. It perpetuated the myth that the Beeching cuts were concerned solely with sleepy rural branch lines, but they actually also concerned well-used "industrial" and commuter lines.

The BBC TV comedy series Oh, Doctor Beeching!, broadcast from 1995 to 1997, was set at a small fictional branch-line railway station threatened with closure under the Beeching cuts.

In the satirical magazine Private Eye, the "Signal Failures" column on railway issues is written under the pseudonym "Dr. B. Ching".

The lyrics of the I Like Trains song "The Beeching Report" are a criticism of Dr Beeching and the Beeching cuts.

Closures by year

After this period, "residual" Beeching closures took place: Bridport to Maiden Newton (in 1975), Alston to Haltwhistle (in 1976), Woodside to Selsdon (in 1983).

See also 
 List of closed railway stations in Britain
 List of heritage railway stations in the United Kingdom

Notes

Sources

  RB(1963a): 
  RB(1963b): 
  
  Ecologics (2010) 
 Richard Faulkner and Chris Austin, Holding the line: How Britain's Railways were saved (2012). Oxford Publishing Co. 
 Allen, G. Freeman (1966). British Railways after Beeching. Shepperton: Ian Allan.
 Gourvish, T. R. (1986). British Rail 1948 – 1973: A Business History. Cambridge.
 Henshaw, David (1994). The Great Railway Conspiracy. .
 Joy, Stewart (1973). The Train That Ran Away: A Business History of British Railways 1948–1968. Shepperton: Ian Allan. 
 Loft, Charles (2013). Last Trains: Dr Beeching and the Death of Rural England. 
 White, H. P. (1986). Forgotten Railways. .

References
Citations

Sources

External links

 Commons debate on the Beeching Report 29 April 1963, discussing the problematic financial implications of Beeching to councils on the provision of more roads and to industry.
 A further Commons debate on Beeching Report 2 May 1963
 Colour film of one of the closed "branch" lines in operation
 Website about Beeching cuts in more detail
 Before and after photo collection of closed stations, with commentaries

1963 in rail transport
1963 in the United Kingdom
Beeching closures
History of British Rail
History of rail transport in the United Kingdom
Transport policy in the United Kingdom